Hypatopa rudis is a moth in the family Blastobasidae. It is found in Costa Rica.

The length of the forewings is about 4.6 mm. The forewings have pale brownish-grey scales tipped with white intermixed with brownish-grey scales. The hindwings are translucent pale brown.

Etymology
The specific name is derived from Latin rudis (meaning a small stick).

References

Moths described in 2013
Hypatopa